The Billboard Creative is an organization that places art by established and emerging artists from around the world on otherwise empty billboards at major junctions across the city of Los Angeles. The Billboard Creative was founded in 2015 by Adam Santelli the Founding Director, with Kim Kerscher, Director and Mona Kuhn, Creative Director.

The Billboard Creative is a 501c3 not-for-profit arts organization.

History 
The Billboard Creative was founded in Los Angeles, California in 2015 by Adam Santelli, Kim Kerscher and Mona Kuhn. It then began producing art shows by renting out unused billboard space as "art replaces advertising"at some of the busiest intersections throughout Los Angeles, for an entire month, annually.

As a nonprofit group, The Billboard Creative has continued to grow by partnering with cultural institutions and distinguished artists. The organization plans to continue providing opportunities for artists to share their work with the broadest audience possible through upcoming special exhibitions, new media projects, and expanding its outdoor art shows to other cities nationwide.

2015 artists
Fall curated by Mona Kuhn, and included artists Shane Guffogg, Kim McCarty, Jack Pierson, Silvia Poloto, and Ed Ruscha.

2016 artists
Curated by Mona Kuhn, and included artists Paul McCarthy and Alex Prager.

2017 artists
Curated by TBC, and included artists Alex Prager, Jennifer Steinkamp, and Mona Kuhn. This exhibition is the first in a series of micro-initiatives, smaller shows aimed at keeping its mission of connecting artists and audiences on the streets of Los Angeles active throughout the year. Prager, Steinkamp, and Kuhn were selected for their unique dialogue with film and photography, two of the quintessential artistic mediums of Los Angeles. All three artists live and work in Los Angeles and play a vibrant role in the cultural community, fostering learning and supporting emerging artists.

2018 artists 
Curated by Andrea Blanch, and included artists Naomi Harris, Marianne Kolb, Steve Miller, Marilyn Minter, Laurie Simmons, Gerald Slota, Spencer Tunick, and Lawrence Weiner.

References

External links

Arts organizations based in California